The Sound Of... McAlmont & Butler is the debut album by English rock and soul duo McAlmont & Butler, recorded from 1994–95 and released in 1995, after the duo had split up. The album is essentially a compilation, comprising both of the band's singles and the B-side tracks thereof, alongside one unreleased track, "The Right Thing'".

On 2 October 2015 a deluxe edition, which included a second disc of unreleased material and a DVD, was released.

Track listing
All songs written by David McAlmont and Bernard Butler, except where noted.

 "Yes" (full version) – 4:53
 "What's the Excuse This Time?" – 4:13
 "The Right Thing" – 6:13
 "Although" – 4:21
 "Don't Call It Soul" – 3:05
 "Disappointment / Interval" – 8:57
 "The Debitor" – 5:11
 "How About You?" – 4:10
 "Tonight" – 5:02
 "You'll Lose a Good Thing" (Huey P. Meaux, Barbara Lynn Ozen) – 4:25
 "You Do" (full length) – 11:10 (includes hidden track)

References

External links

The Sound Of... McAlmont & Butler at YouTube (streamed copy where licensed)

1995 debut albums
McAlmont & Butler albums
Albums produced by Bernard Butler
Albums produced by Mike Hedges
Hut Records albums